Robert Harold Moore (13 May 1924 – January 1978) was a United States Air Force flying ace of the Korean War, credited with shooting down five enemy aircraft in the war, all as a member of the 51st Fighter Interceptor Wing. Moore made his first kill on 28 October 1951 and fifth on 3 April 1952, all while flying the North American F-86 Sabre and all with the 16th Fighter Squadron except for one kill made with the 336th Fighter Squadron. He was the ninth American ace of the war.

See also
List of Korean War flying aces

References

Sources
 (1972 Arno Press edition )

1924 births
1978 deaths
American Korean War flying aces
Recipients of the Distinguished Flying Cross (United States)
United States Air Force officers
United States Army Air Forces pilots of World War II
People from Hillsboro, Texas
United States Air Force personnel of the Korean War
Military personnel from Texas